The Slovenian National Road Race Championships have been held since independence of Slovenia in 1991.

After Blaž Jarc (U23 category) set absolute best time in 2009 Championships and beat all top riders (Elite category), Slovenian Cycling Federation (KZS) decided to change rules and make it more understable to public. Unlike before, when the U23 results were counted only in their own category, from 2010 onwards, the potential U23 winner by time becomes the Elite - absolute champion (the same goes for 2nd, 3rd... place).

Multiple champions 
Riders that managed to win the Elite race more than once.

Elite
At the 1st Championships held in Slovenske Konjice (1991), Slovenia was already over one month independent (widely recognized early next year), but cyclists were still under Yugoslav Cycling Federation (BSJ).

President of BSJ forbade Slovenia to organize National Championships, but they did it anyway. A day later BSJ annulled the "illegitimate" event. But Slovenian Cycling Federation recognized it as official.

Men

Women

See also
Slovenian National Time Trial Championships
National Road Cycling Championships
Yugoslav National Road Race Championships

References

National road cycling championships
Cycle races in Slovenia
Recurring sporting events established in 1996
1996 establishments in Slovenia
National championships in Slovenia